This is a list of notable automobile manufacturers with articles on Wikipedia by country. It is a subset of the list of automobile manufacturers for manufacturers based in African countries. It includes companies that are in business as well as defunct manufacturers.

Algeria 
SNVI (1967)

Egypt 
Arab American Vehicles
Bavarian Auto Group
General Motors Egypt
Ghabbour Group
Nissan Motor Egypt
Seoudi Group
Speranza Motors

Ghana 
Kantanka cars

Kenya 
 Mobius Motors (2013)
 Nyayo Car (1986)

Morocco 
Laraki (1999)
Société Automobiles Ménara (1972)
Somaca (1959)

Nigeria 
Innoson Vehicle Manufacturing (2013)
Nord

South Africa 
Birkin Cars
BMW South Africa
Brandt BRV
Ford Motor Company of Southern Africa (FMCSA)
Harper
Isuzu South Africa
Land Systems
Motorite Racing
N4 Trucks
Nissan South Africa
SAMIL Trucks
Paramount Group
Puma
Toyota South Africa Motors

Former
AMCAR
Delta Motors
Peugeot and Citroën South Africa (PACSA)
General Motors South Africa
Glass Sport Motors (GSM)
Ranger
Samcor
SIGMA
Uri

Tunisia 
Industries Mécaniques Maghrébines (IMM)
Wallyscar (2007)

Uganda 
 Kiira Motors Corporation (KMC) (2015)

See also
List of automobile manufacturers
List of automobile marques

References 

Lists of automobile manufacturers